The 2017 season is the 141st season of competitive soccer in Canada.

On April 10, 2017, the Canadian Soccer Association announced a joint bid for the 2026 FIFA World Cup along with the United States Soccer Federation and the Mexican Football Federation.  The announced proposal would see Canada host ten matches of the eighty expected to take place during the tournament.

National teams 

When available, the home team or the team that is designated as the home team is listed in the left column; the away team is in the right column.

Senior Men

2017 Gold Cup 

 eliminated in the quarterfinals.

Friendlies

Senior Women

2017 Algarve Cup 

 finishes in  second place.

Friendlies

Domestic leagues

Men

Major League Soccer 

Three Canadian teams (Montreal Impact, Toronto FC, and Vancouver Whitecaps FC) play in this league, which also contains 19 teams from the United States.  It is considered a Division 1 league in the United States soccer league system.

Overall standings

North American Soccer League 

One Canadian team (FC Edmonton) plays in this league, which also contains seven teams from the United States.  It is considered a Division 2 league in the United States soccer league system.

Overall standings

United Soccer League 

Three Canadian teams (Ottawa Fury FC, Toronto FC II, and Whitecaps FC 2) play in this league, which also contains 27 teams from the United States.  It is considered a Division 2 league in the United States soccer league system.

Eastern Conference

Western Conference

League1 Ontario 

16 teams play in this league, all of which are based in Canada.  It is considered a Division 3 league in the Canadian soccer league system.

 Eastern Conference

 Western Conference

 League Championship
The league champion is determined by a single-match series between the top-ranked teams from the western and eastern conferences. The winner qualifies for the 2018 Canadian Championship.

Première Ligue de soccer du Québec 

Seven teams play in this league, all of which are based in Canada.  It is considered a Division 3 league in the Canadian soccer league system.

Premier Development League 

Six Canadian teams play in this league, which also contains 66 teams from the United States.  It is considered a Division 4 league in the United States soccer league system.

Great Lakes Division –  K-W United FC

Heartland Division –  Thunder Bay Chill, WSA Winnipeg

Northwest Division –  Calgary Foothills FC, TSS FC Rovers, Victoria Highlanders

Canadian Soccer League 
 
Sixteen teams play in this league, all of which are based in Canada. It is a Non-FIFA league previously sanctioned by the Canadian Soccer Association and is now a member of the Soccer Federation of Canada (SFC).
First Division 

Second Division

Women

National Women's Soccer League 

No Canadian teams play in this league, though ten players from the Canada women's national soccer team are allocated to its teams by the Canadian Soccer Association. It is considered a Division 1 league in the Canadian soccer league system.

United Women's Soccer 

One Canadian team (Calgary Foothills WFC) plays in this league, which also contains 19 teams from the United States.  It is considered a Division 2 league in the Canadian soccer league system.

Women's Premier Soccer League 

One Canadian team (NSGSC) plays in this league, which also contains 103 teams from the United States.  It is considered a Division 2 league in the Canadian soccer league system.

League1 Ontario 

11 teams play in this league, all of which are based in Canada.  It is considered a Division 3 league in the Canadian soccer league system.

Domestic cups

Men

Canadian Championship 

The Canadian Championship is contested by professional men's teams at the division 1 & 2 level.

Challenge Trophy 

The Challenge Trophy is a national cup contested by men's teams at the division 4 level and below.

Women

Jubilee Trophy  

The Jubilee Trophy is a national cup contested by women's teams at the division 4 level and below.

Canadian clubs in international competition

2016–17 CONCACAF Champions League 

 Vancouver Whitecaps FC wins 3–1 on aggregate.

 Vancouver Whitecaps FC loses 4–1 on aggregate.

References

External links 
 Canadian Soccer Association

 
Seasons in Canadian soccer